"I Don't Want to Do Wrong" is a song recorded by Gladys Knight & the Pips. It was released in May 1971 from the album If I Were Your Woman.

The song reached number two on the Best Selling Soul Singles chart. On the pop charts, it peaked at No. 17 on Billboard and No. 9 on Cash Box.  It was a more modest hit in Canada.

Chart history

References

External links
 

1971 songs
1971 singles
Gladys Knight & the Pips songs
Motown singles
Songs written by Johnny Bristol
Song recordings produced by Johnny Bristol